The Assam macaque (Macaca assamensis) or Assamese macaque is a macaque of the Old World monkey family native to South and Southeast Asia. Since 2008, it has been listed as Near Threatened on the IUCN Red List, as it is experiencing significant declines due to poaching, habitat degradation, and fragmentation.

Characteristics 
The Assam macaque has a yellowish-grey to dark brown pelage. The facial skin is dark brownish to purplish. The head has a dark fringe of hair on the cheeks directed backwards to the ears. The hair on the crown is parted in the middle. The shoulders, head and arms tend to be paler than the hindquarters, which are greyish. The tail is well-haired and short.

Distribution and habitat 

The Macaca assamensis "Nepal population" is endemic to Nepal and likely in some way distinct from the two recognized subspecies, which occupy adjacent areas to the southeast and east of the range of M. assamensis. There is a gap in northeastern India between the two main population pockets, specifically between central Bhutan and the south side of the Brahmaputra River; the east bank of its upper course marks the division between the two recognized subspecies:
 The eastern Assamese macaque, M. a. assamensis, occurs in Bhutan, Arunachal Pradesh, Assam, Manipur, Meghalaya, Mizoram, Nagaland, Sikkim, and Tripura in northeastern India, into northern Myanmar, southeast through the Myanmar-Thailand border ranges as far as Chongkrong, to the upper Mekong in Tibet, into the provinces of Guangxi, Guizhou, Tibet and Yunnan in southwestern China, in Thateng in northern Laos, and Hoi Xuan in northern Vietnam;
 The western Assamese macaque, M. a. pelops, is found from central Nepal through Uttar Pradesh, Sikkim, Assam and northernmost West Bengal in northern India, into central Bhutan and the Sundarbans in Bangladesh.

They are apparently absent from areas west of the Kaligandaki River. They usually inhabit hill areas above , but in the wetter east they may occur even in the lowlands, and frequent areas that only marginally reach this altitude. In Laos and Vietnam, they prefer high altitudes, usually above . In forests on limestone karst, they occur in much lower elevations.

Ecology and behaviour
Assam macaques are diurnal, and at times both arboreal and terrestrial. They are omnivorous and feed on fruits, leaves, invertebrates and cereals.
In Namdapha National Park, Arunachal Pradesh, 15 groups were recorded in 2002 comprising 209 individuals. The population had a group density of 1.11 individuals per , and an average group size of 13.93 individuals.
Troop sizes varied between 13 and 35 individuals, with a mean troop size of 23.66 individuals, and comprised 31% adult females, 16% adult males, and their young of various ages. They preferred maize kernals, followed by potato tubers, but also raided fields with wheat, buckwheat, and millet.

Threats 
The threats to this species' habitat include selective logging and various forms of anthropogenic development and activities, alien invasives, hunting and trapping for sport, medicine, food, and the pet trade. Additionally, hybridization with adjacent species poses a threat to some populations.

Conservation 
Macaca assamensis is listed in CITES Appendix II. It is legally protected in all countries of occurrence. For the populations in India, the species is listed under Schedule II, part I of the Indian Wildlife Act.

References

External links

ARKive: Assam macaque (Macaca assamensis)

Assam macaque
Primates of Asia
Mammals of Bangladesh
Mammals of Bhutan
Mammals of Myanmar
Mammals of China
Mammals of India
Mammals of Laos
Mammals of Nepal
Mammals of Thailand
Mammals of Vietnam
Fauna of Yunnan
Fauna of Assam
Assam macaque
Taxa named by John McClelland (doctor)